Mothonica ocellea is a moth of the family Depressariidae. It is found in Guatemala, Cuba and Puerto Rico.

The larvae feed within the fruit of Talisia svensoni.

References

Mothonica
Moths described in 1930